Zante Ferries, also known as ANMEZ (Ανώνυμη Ναυτιλιακή Μεταφορική Εταιρεία Ζακύνθου) in Greek, is a Greek ferry company operating from the Greek mainland to the West Cyclades, Samothrace and Lemnos from the ports of Piraeus and Alexandroupolis. The company was founded on 25 January 1991 and operates a fleet of conventional ferries.

Routes

 Piraeus - Kythnos - Serifos - Sifnos - Milos - Kimolos - Folegandros - Sikinos - Ios - Santorini
 Alexandroupolis - Samothrace - Lemnos

Fleet
As of January 2019, Zante Ferries operates the following fleet.

References

Ferry companies of Greece
Companies based in Athens
Companies based in Piraeus
Transport companies established in 1991
Greek companies established in 1991